The 1921 Minneapolis Marines season was their inaugural season in the National Football League. The team finished with a 1–3 record against league opponents, and tied for thirteenth place in the league.

Schedule

Games in italics are against non-NFL teams.

Standings

References

Minneapolis Marines seasons
Minneapolis Marines
Minneapolis Marines